M64 or M-64 may refer to:

 Messier 64, a spiral galaxy known as the Black Eye Galaxy
 M64 motorway, a motorway planned, but never built, in England
 M-64 (Michigan highway), a north–south highway in the Upper Peninsula of the US state of Michigan.
 Super Mario 64, a platform game made by Nintendo; or its remake, Super Mario 64 DS